Allen Woodring (February 15, 1898 – November 15, 1982) was an American sprint runner. At the 1920 Olympic trials, he failed to qualify in the 200 metres yet was selected for the national team and won the Olympic gold medal in this event.

Woodring ran for Mercersburg Academy under Jimmy Curran, before competing for the Meadowbrook Club of Philadelphia. He graduated from Syracuse University and later worked as a salesman for the Spalding Company.

After his athletics career ended he worked as a salesman for Sears, Roebuck & Co. In his later years he moved to Florida.

References

External links 

 

1898 births
1982 deaths
American male sprinters
Athletes (track and field) at the 1920 Summer Olympics
Olympic gold medalists for the United States in track and field
Mercersburg Academy alumni
Medalists at the 1920 Summer Olympics
Sportspeople from Northampton County, Pennsylvania
Track and field athletes from Pennsylvania